Lakshmi Kalyanam is an Indian Tamil-language soap opera starring Yuvarani, Deepika, Sathiya Sai, Ashwin Kumar and Shyam. It is a remake of the Telugu-language television series of the same title which airs on Maa TV from 2016. It broadcast on Vijay TV on Monday to Friday from 7 February 2017 to 23 June 2017 at 21:30 (IST) for 98 Episodes. It replaced Kalyanam Mudhal Kadhal Varai.

Synopsis
It is a story about two sisters Lakshmi and Swathi who lost their mother early in their life. Lakshmi looks after her sister and runs an embroidery store to support the family and fund Swathi's education but, after she makes a big sacrifice for Swathi, there are consequences for them all.

Cast
 Deepika as Lakshmi 
 Sathiya Sai as Swati
 Yuvarani as Rajeshwari
 Ashwin Kumar as Kalyan
 Shyam as Ajay
 Kumaresan as Moorthi
 VJ Mounika as Varsha
 Madhu Mohan

Development
On 17 January 2017, the first promotion film for the show, titled "Childhood" was released by Vijay TV on YouTube. On 21 February 2017, the second, third and fourth promotion films, titled "Young Age" were released by Vijay TV.

Adaptations

References

External links
Official website

Star Vijay original programming
Tamil-language romance television series
2017 Tamil-language television series debuts
Tamil-language television series based on Telugu-language television series
Tamil-language television shows
2017 Tamil-language television series endings